Mesostigma is a genus of freshwater green algae, with a single species Mesostigma viride. , AlgaeBase classified it as the only genus in the family Mesostigmataceae, the only family in the order Mesostigmatales, the only order in the class Mesostigmatophyceae. It is now considered to be one of the earliest diverging members of green plants/algae (Viridiplantae).

Earlier studies were unable to resolve the position of the species, and it was often placed as a sister to all other green algae, as one of the basal members of the Streptophyta, or as close to Chaetosphaeridium. More recent studies agree that Mesostigma and Chlorokybus form a clade, being the earliest diverging green plants.

References

External links 
 from Algaebase

Charophyta genera
Monotypic algae genera